Ingmar Ljones (born 3 December 1943 in Strandebarm) is a Norwegian politician for the Christian Democratic Party.

He was elected to the Norwegian Parliament from Hordaland in 2001, but was not re-elected in 2005. He then served in the position of deputy representative during the term 2005–2009.

Ljones held various positions in Bergen city council from 1979 to 2001, serving as deputy mayor in 1991–1995 and 1999–2000 as well as mayor in 1995–1999 and 2000–2001.

References

1943 births
Living people
Members of the Storting
Christian Democratic Party (Norway) politicians
Mayors of Bergen
21st-century Norwegian politicians